Stratford District is a territorial authority district in the North Island of New Zealand. The Stratford District Council is headquartered in the only town, Stratford. The district is divided between the Manawatū-Whanganui region (including the settlements of Whangamōmona, Marco and Tahora, 31.87% of its land area) and the Taranaki region (68.13% of its land area).

This comprises  people in the Stratford urban area, and  people in rural areas and settlements. 

Mayor Neil Volzke was elected as mayor in a 2009 by-election, and most recently re-elected in the 2019 local elections.

Council history
The first Stratford Town Board was formed in 1882. Stratford County Council was formed in 1890 and Stratford Borough Council was formed in 1898. The two merged to become Stratford District as part of the 1989 local government reforms.

Past mayors, chairmen, clerks and CEOs

Stratford Town Chairmen
 George Newsham Curtis (1882–1885)
 Charles Stuart Curtis (1885–1890)
 Ebenezer Burgess (1890–1892, 1896–1898)
 William Loftus Tocker (1892–1894)
 J B Patton (1894–1896)

Stratford Borough mayors

 Harry Norman Liardet (1898–1899, 1902–1903)
 Frederick James Steuart (1900–1901)
 Reginald Brooking Tatton (1901–1902)
 Nathaniel John King (1903–1907)
 Pilcher Frederick Ralfe (1907–1908)
 George A Sangster (1908–1910)
 Jonas Masters (1910–1912)
 William Patrick Kirkwood (1912–1915)
 Josephiah Wedgwood Boon (1915–1917)
 James Watson McMillan (1917–1929, 1933–1938)
 Percy Thomson (1929–1933, 1938–1947)
 Norman Harold Moss (1947–1957)
 George John Wedgwood Boon (1957–1971)
 Leo George Wellington Carrington (1971–1986)
 Lachlan Grant Bond (1986–1989)

Stratford County chairmen

 George Albert Marchant (1890–1892, 1905–1912)
 William Monkhouse (1892–1896)
 Joseph Mackay (1896–1899, 1900–1905)
 Richard Dingle (1900)
 William Hathaway (1912–1917)
 Edward Walter (1917–1925)
 Thomas Rheese Anderson (1925–1938)
 Joe C Best (1928–1946)
 Bruce Hutchen (1946–1970)
 Len C Harrison (1970–1977)
 HH Paul Cook (1977–1983)
 David Walter (1983–1989)

Stratford District Council mayors
 David Walter (1989–1998)
 Brian Robert Jeffares (1998–2007)
 John Edwards (2007–2009) (Died while in office)
 Neil Volzke (2009–)

Stratford Town Clerks
 Thomas Harry Penn (1898–1902)
 Ernest F Hemingway (1902–1911)
 Phillip Skogland (1911–1936)
 Gerald C Grace (1936–1975)
 P A Tourell (1975–1985)
 F W Bullen (1985–1989)

Stratford County Clerks
 William George Malone (1891–1900)
 Charles Penn (1900–1931)
 C L J Campbell (1931–1945)
 T A Jones (1945–1968)
 Ken J Little (1968–1975)
 MD Bell (1975–1977)
 Ross D Smith (1977–1989)

Stratford District Chief Executives
 Poiha Kemp Broughton (1989–2001)
 Wayne Allan Kimber (2001–2004)
 Michael Roy Freeman (2004–2011)
 Sue Davidson (2011–2014)
 Matt O'Mara (2015–2017)
 Sven Hanne (2017–)

Demographics

Stratford District had a population of 9,474 at the 2018 New Zealand census, an increase of 486 people (5.4%) since the 2013 census, and an increase of 585 people (6.6%) since the 2006 census. There were 3,687 households, comprising 4,722 males and 4,752 females, giving a sex ratio of 0.99 males per female. The median age was 39.6 years (compared with 37.4 years nationally), with 2,043 people (21.6%) aged under 15 years, 1,635 (17.3%) aged 15 to 29, 4,152 (43.8%) aged 30 to 64, and 1,644 (17.4%) aged 65 or older.

Ethnicities were 91.4% European/Pākehā, 14.2% Māori, 1.4% Pacific peoples, 2.5% Asian, and 1.5% other ethnicities. People may identify with more than one ethnicity.

The percentage of people born overseas was 9.3, compared with 27.1% nationally.

Although some people chose not to answer the census's question about religious affiliation, 50.2% had no religion, 37.7% were Christian, 0.4% had Māori religious beliefs, 0.4% were Hindu, 0.3% were Buddhist and 1.4% had other religions.

Of those at least 15 years old, 669 (9.0%) people had a bachelor's or higher degree, and 2,142 (28.8%) people had no formal qualifications. The median income was $28,700, compared with $31,800 nationally. 924 people (12.4%) earned over $70,000 compared to 17.2% nationally. The employment status of those at least 15 was that 3,672 (49.4%) people were employed full-time, 1,080 (14.5%) were part-time, and 270 (3.6%) were unemployed.

Physical geography

The Stratford District takes in about one quarter of the Taranaki Region, and includes four major geological features: the Taranaki volcanic cone, its associated ring plain, the Pātea River catchment, and the eastern hill country.

Taranaki Volcanic Cone
The south-eastern face of Mount Taranaki is in the Stratford district, the north-westernmost point of the district being the 2518 m high peak. From the peak the boundaries run almost due east and due south.

Pembroke Road winds up the mountain slope from Stratford to a carpark and lookout at "The Plateau", at  Manganui skifield is a short hike from the carpark, across the Manganui Gorge.

On the south-eastern face of the mountain, Manaia Road gives access to Dawson Falls and the Konini Lodge, at  altitude.  The natural Wilkies Pools are a short hike above the lodge.

Taranaki Volcanic Ring Plain
The Taranaki volcanic ring plain provides a steady contour with a subtle gradient, upon which Stratford and its environs have been settled.  The easy gradient and rich volcanic soils and the high level of rainfall provide high quality pasture and agricultural land. Within this area the ring plain is drained by three river catchments: the Manganui River catchment to the north, the Waingongoro River catchment to the south, and the dominant Pātea River catchment.

Pātea River
The headwaters of the Pātea River are on the eastern face of Mount Taranaki, above Stratford.  From there the river flows eastwards, its upper catchment taking in a narrow area of land between the Manganui River catchment to the north and the Waingongoro River catchment to the south.

Due to the narrow width of the catchment, the southern boundary of the town is on the Pātea/Waingongoro divide, while  to the north Midhirst is on the Pātea/Manganui divide.

Beyond Stratford the catchment widens significantly to include a number of ancient swamps, including Ngaere and Toko, and also the Kahouri and Piakau ring plain streams. The river then takes in the expansive eastern hill country catchments of the Toko, Makuri, Mangaehu, Mangaotuku, Puniwhakau and Makahu Streams, before winding its way southwards through the hills of the South Taranaki district, to its mouth at Patea.

Eastern hill country
This area is dominated by steep sandstone, greywacke and mudstone hills and winding valleys. Much of the steep and isolated hill country is in native or exotic forestry. The remainder of the district is in sheep and/or beef pastoral farming.

Much of the eastern hill country falls within the catchment of the Pātea River and its tributaries. However, to the north the district takes in Waitara River and its tributaries, including the Makara, Makino, Matau, Mangapapa and Mangaowata catchments. At its northernmost point the district also includes the Mt Damper Stream and its associated swamp and falls, which feed into the Tongaporutu River.

In the east the district takes in the Whangamōmona River catchment, and also most of the Tangarakau River catchment, both of which feed into the Whanganui River. This area is separated from the west by the densely forested Whangamōmona Saddle, making it an isolated and distinctive part of the district, and the area once had its own county council.

To the south-east the district also takes in the upper reaches of the Waitōtara River catchment, within the Matemateāonga Range and the Waitōtara Conservation Area.

Surrounding settlements
Stratford is surrounded by a number of small villages and settlements.  To the north on State Highway 3 are Midhirst and beyond that Waipuku, and to the south is the locality of Ngaere. Cardiff, Mahoe, Rowan and Pembroke are beneath the mountain to the west, and Wharehuia, Tuna, Te Popo and Kupe are to the north-east.

To the east, along State Highway 43 and the Stratford-Okahukura railway, lie settlements that in their heyday were bustling villages. Toko and the renowned Whangamōmona have retained their character as villages, while the settlements of Douglas, Strathmore, Huiakama, Te Wera, Pohokura, Marco, Kohuratahi and Tahora now consist of no more than a few houses.  Along roads off State Highway 3 are a number of other settlements, some of which were also once bustling villages. Huiroa, Kiore, Matau and Mt. Damper are to the north and west of the highway, and Huinga, Tututawa, Puniwhakau, Makahu, Aotuhia and Tangarakau are to the south and east.

National parks
Stratford is the gateway to two National Parks – Egmont National Park to the west, and Whanganui National Park to the east (via Kohi Saddle, Aotuhia).

Economy

The Egmont Ring Plain provides steady contours and fertile volcanic soils which, together with the high level of rainfall, make for some of the best dairy country in New Zealand. The district is predominantly dairying (57,300 dairy cattle), while the rolling to steep eastern hill country supports dry stock farming and forestry (42,000 beef cattle; 281,300 sheep).

The energy and tourism industries are both of growing significance to the Stratford District.

Education

There are two secondary schools in Stratford: Stratford High School and Taranaki Diocesan School for Girls. There are three primary schools within Stratford township: Stratford Primary School, Avon School and St Joseph's School

There are seven primary schools in the surrounding district. Recent years has seen the consolidation of a large number of schools into these seven schools:
Midhirst School
Ngaere School
Pembroke School
Toko School
Huiakama School
Marco School
Makahu School

Sister cities
Stratford is a member of the Stratford Sister Cities program which was created to promote friendship and cultural exchange between participating countries. Participation is restricted to places called "Stratford" that have a Shakespeare Theatre or Festival. A reunion is held every second year by a different member.

The five principal sister cities of Stratford, New Zealand are:
  Stratford-upon-Avon, England
  Stratford, Victoria, Australia
  Stratford, Ontario, Canada
  Stratford, Connecticut, United States
  Stratford, Prince Edward Island, Canada

References

External links 

 
Districts of New Zealand